The United States women's national under-20 volleyball team represents the United States in international women's volleyball competitions and friendly matches under the age 20 and it is ruled by the American Volleyball Federation USAV body That is an affiliate of the International Volleyball Federation FIVB and also a part of the North, Central America and Caribbean Volleyball Confederation NORCECA.

Results

FIVB U20 World Championship
 Champions   Runners up   Third place   Fourth place

NORCECA U20 Championship
 Champions   Runners up   Third place   Fourth place

Pan-American U20 Cup
 Champions   Runners up   Third place   Fourth place

Team

Current squad
The following is the American roster in the 2017 FIVB Volleyball Women's U20 World Championship.

Head coach: Laurie Corbelli

Notable players

 Foluke Akinradewo
 Christa Harmotto
 Cassidy Lichtman
 Kelly Murphy
 Lauren Gibbemeyer

References

External links
 www.usavolleyball.org

National women's under-20 volleyball teams
Volleyball in the United States
Volleyball